The Noire River (in English: Black River) is the most important tributary of the Yamaska River. The Black River flows on the South Shore of the Saint Lawrence River, in Quebec, Canada, passing through the municipalities of:

MRC Memphrémagog Regional County Municipality in the administrative region of Estrie:
 Stukely-Sud,

MRC Le Val-Saint-François Regional County Municipality in the administrative region of Estrie:
 Sainte-Anne-de-la-Rochelle,
 Lawrenceville,
 Valcourt,
 Maricourt,

MRC of Acton Regional County Municipality in the administrative region of Montérégie
 Sainte-Christine
 Roxton
 Roxton Falls
 Acton Vale
 Saint-Théodore-d'Acton
 Upton

MRC Les Maskoutains Regional County Municipality in the administrative region of Montérégie
 Saint-Valérien-de-Milton
 Saint-Pie

MRC of La Haute-Yamaska Regional County Municipality in the administrative region of Montérégie
 Sainte-Cécile-de-Milton

Geography 
The main neighboring hydrographic slopes of the Black River are:
 north side: David River, Saint-Germain River, Chibouet River;
 east side: Rivière le Renne, Saint-François River, Jaune River (Noire River tributary), Rouge River (Noire River tributary);
 south side: North Yamaska River;
 west side: Yamaska River.

The Black River begins in an area northeast of Waterloo Lake in the Municipality of Stukely-Sud.

Upper course of the river (segment of )

From a very small head lake located in Stukely-Sud, the Rivière Noire flows over:
  to the Rouge River (coming from the southeast) whose mouth is located northwest of the village of Lawrenceville;
  northeasterly to route 222, west of the village of Valcourt;

Course of the river downstream of Valcourt (segment of )

From route 222, passing through the village of Valcourt, the Rivière Noire flows over:
  north to the Bombardier stream (coming from the east);
  south-west to the Rang 7e bridge;
  southwesterly to Beauregard brook (coming from the south);
  north-west to Savoie stream (coming from the south);
  north to Roxton Falls located in the village of Roxton Falls.

Course of the river downstream of Roxton Falls (segment of )

From Roxton Falls, the river flows over:
  north-west to the rang 1e bridge;
  north-west to the Île aux Pins Rapide;
  towards the south-west, passing in front of "Place-Lavallée", to the Runnels stream (coming from the south);
  towards the north-west, passing south of the village of Acton Vale, to the mouth of the rivière le Renne (coming from the north- East) ;
  southwesterly to route 116 which passes through the southern part of the village of Upton;
  south-west to the Père-Tarte dam.

Course of the river downstream of the Père-Tarte dam (segment of )

From the Père-Tarte dam, the Rivière Noire flows over:
  southwesterly to the road bridge on Chemin Saint-Dominique in Saint-Valérien-de-Milton;
  south-west to the Rang de l'Égypte bridge;
  southwest to the route 137 bridge;
  south-west to the third rang West bridge;
  westward, passing north of Mont Yamaska, to the Émileville dam, near the hamlet of Émileville;
  north-west to the route 235 bridge in the village of Saint-Pie;
  north-west to the mouth.

The Black River empties at the "Pointe aux Fourches" on the east bank of the Yamaska River at Saint-Pie.

Toponymy 
The traditional Aboriginal toponymic variant is "Mkazawitekw River".

The toponym “Rivière Noire” was officially registered on December 5, 1968, at the Commission de toponymie du Québec.

See also 
 List of rivers of Quebec

References 

Rivers of Montérégie
Les Maskoutains Regional County Municipality
Memphrémagog Regional County Municipality
Le Val-Saint-François Regional County Municipality
Acton Regional County Municipality
La Haute-Yamaska Regional County Municipality